Antofagasta plc is a Chilean multinational. It is one of the most important conglomerates of Chile with equity participation in Antofagasta Minerals, the railroad from Antofagasta to Bolivia, Twin Metals in Minnesota and other exploration joint ventures in different parts from the world. Antofagasta is listed on the London Stock Exchange and is a constituent of the FTSE 100 Index.

History 
The Group began life as Ferrocarril de Antofagasta a Bolivia, a business that was incorporated and listed on the London Stock Exchange in 1888 with the objective of operating a railway between Antofagasta, a port on the Pacific Coast of Northern Chile, and La Paz, the capital City of Bolivia.

In 1980, the controlling stake was acquired by the Grupo Luksic, and the two businesses were subsequently integrated under the name Antofagasta Holdings.

During the 1980s, Antofagasta Holdings diversified into other areas such as mining in Michilla, in which it invested in 1983, and mining in the Pelambres, in which it invested in 1986, in addition to telecommunications.

In 1996, Antofagasta Holdings transferred its banking activities and its industrial interests to Quiñenco S.A., another diversified Chilean company also controlled by the Luksic family. This transfer allowed Antofagasta Holdings to concentrate on the development of the Pelambres and the Tesoro mines and establish itself as a low cost copper producer. The shortened name, Antofagasta, was adopted in 1999.

The Los Pelambres mine was first recognized by Willian Burford Braden in 1920.  One of the largest copper deposits in the world, production in 2016 was forecasted at 355–365,000 tonnes of copper, 45–55,000 ounces of gold and 8.0–9.0 tonnes of molybdenum.

In 2009, Antofagasta PLC signed an agreement with the Australian company Carbon Energy to develop an underground coal gasification project in Mulpún, in Southern Chile. The project was put on hold in 2013.

In 2015 Antofagasta took control of Twin Metals, a US company involved in a copper and nickel mining project in Northern Minnesota. Under President Barack Obama, the US administration declined to renew the leases for the lands on which the mining project was planned. However, this position was reversed during the Trump Presidency. The mining project commenced a long permitting process, involving significant environmental issues, being located near wilderness area with many lakes and rivers. The project's reversal of fortunes angered environmentalists and focused attention on an unusual connection between a Chilean billionaire and President Trump's family.

In February 2016 Antofagasta signed an agreement with junior explorer Evrim Resources to earn an interest in the Ball Creek property located in British Columbia. Antofagasta can earn a 70% interest in the project by spending US$31 million over a thirteen-year period. 

The company sold its idled Michilla mine in Chile for $52m in 2016. The sale included various mining properties but kept some facilities like the sulphuric acid terminal used by mines in Centinela and Antucoya (an oxide deposit near Michilla).

Operations
Antofagasta is one of the major international copper producers with its activities concentrated mainly in Chile where it now operates four copper mines: Los Pelambres, Centinela (previously the Esperanza and Tesoro mines), Antucoya and Zaldivar (50% owned, 50% owned by the Canadian mining company Barrick Gold).

Ownership
The company is 65% owned by the Chilean Luksic family.

References

External links

 Official Antofagasta PLC website—
 

Conglomerate companies of Chile
Copper mining companies of Chile
Investment companies of Chile
Multinational companies headquartered in Chile
Companies based in Antofagasta Region
Conglomerate companies established in 1888
1888 establishments in Chile
Mining companies based in London
Companies listed on the London Stock Exchange